Melanoidins are brown, high molecular weight heterogeneous polymers that are formed when sugars and amino acids combine (through the Maillard Reaction) at high temperatures and low water activity.  They were discovered by Schmiedeberg in 1897.
Melanoidins are commonly present in foods that have undergone some form of non-enzymatic browning, such as barley malts (Vienna and Munich), bread crust, bakery products and coffee.  They are also present in the wastewater of sugar refineries, necessitating treatment in order to avoid contamination around the outflow of these refineries.

The polymers make the constituting dietary sugars and fats unavailable to the normal carbohydrate and fat metabolism. Dietary melanoidins themselves produce various effects in the organism: they decrease Phase I liver enzyme activity and promote glycation in vivo, which may contribute to diabetes, reduced vascular compliance and Alzheimer's disease. Some of the melanoidins are metabolized by the intestinal microflora.

Coffee is one of the main sources of melanoidins in the human diet, yet coffee consumption is associated with some  health benefits and  antiglycative action.

References 

Food science